Port of Pori is a complex of three harbours. It is by the Gulf of Bothnia in Pori, Finland. The port authority of Pori was established in 1780. Today the Port of Pori is a corporation owned by the city.

Port of Pori has liner service to several ports in Northern Europe, for example Hamburg, Ghent, St. Petersburg and Teesport.

Mäntyluoto
Mäntyluoto harbour has docks for container traffic and dry bulk. The 200-ton crane Masa is the strongest in Finnish ports.

Tahkoluoto
The Tahkoluoto bulk harbour has  draught which allows access for capesize vessels. Oil and chemical harbour operates in a separate area.

See also
Kallo Lighthouse

References

External links

Port of Pori homepage

Pori
Buildings and structures in Pori